Wikus Christian Groenewald (born ) is a South African rugby union player for Rugby ATL of Major League Rugby (MLR). His regular position is at prop.

In March 2021, as COVID19 restrictions were relaxed, he joined Rugby ATL in Atlanta, Georgia.

References

South African rugby union players
Living people
1997 births
People from Somerset West
Rugby union props
Boland Cavaliers players
Pumas (Currie Cup) players
South Africa Under-20 international rugby union players
Leopards (rugby union) players
Rugby ATL players
Rugby union players from the Western Cape